The cabinet of Vintilă I. C. Brătianu was the government of Romania from 24 November 1927 to 9 November 1928.

Ministers
The ministers of the cabinet were as follows:

President of the Council of Ministers:
Vintilă I. C. Brătianu (24 November 1927 - 9 November 1928)
Minister of the Interior: 
Ion Gh. Duca (24 November 1927 - 9 November 1928)
Minister of Foreign Affairs: 
Nicolae Titulescu (24 November 1927 - 3 August 1928)
(interim) Constantin Argetoianu (3 August - 9 November 1928)
Minister of Finance:
Vintilă I.C. Brătianu (24 November 1927 - 9 November 1928)
Minister of Justice:
Stelian Popescu (24 November 1927 - 9 November 1928)
Minister of War:
Gen. Paul Angelescu (24 November 1927 - 9 November 1928)
Minister of Public Works:
Ion Nistor (24 November 1927 - 9 November 1928)
Minister of Agriculture and Property:
Constantin Argetoianu (24 November 1927 - 9 November 1928)
Minister of Communications:
Constantin D. Dimitriu (24 November 1927 - 9 November 1928)
Minister of Industry and Commerce:
Ludovic Mrazec (24 November 1927 - 9 November 1928)
Minister of Public Instruction:
Constantin Angelescu (24 November 1927 - 9 November 1928)
Minister of Religious Affairs and the Arts:
Alexandru Lapedatu (24 November 1927 - 9 November 1928)
Ministry of Labour, Social Insurance and Cooperation
Nicolae Lupu (24 November 1927 - 9 November 1928)
Minister of Public Health and Social Welfare:
Ion Inculeț (24 November 1927 - 9 November 1928)

References

Cabinets of Romania
Cabinets established in 1927
Cabinets disestablished in 1928
1927 establishments in Romania
1928 disestablishments in Romania